George Lane Vivian (4 October 1872 – 6 October 1936) was a Canadian sport shooter who competed at the 1908 Summer Olympics.

In the 1908 Olympics he won a silver medal in team trap shooting event and was 20th in the individual trap shooting event. Vivian committed suicide by shooting himself in 1936.

References

External links
profile

1872 births
1936 suicides
Canadian male sport shooters
Olympic shooters of Canada
Shooters at the 1908 Summer Olympics
Olympic silver medalists for Canada
Olympic medalists in shooting
Medalists at the 1908 Summer Olympics
Sportspeople from Sault Ste. Marie, Ontario
Suicides by firearm in Ontario
20th-century Canadian people